Mendon Presbyterian Church is a historic Presbyterian church located at Mendon in Monroe County, New York. It is an eclectic Gothic Revival style building constructed in 1900. The buildings interior features a "Combination Church Plan" incorporating a meeting room with the main auditorium separated by a set of large folding doors.

It was listed on the National Register of Historic Places in 2005.

References

Churches on the National Register of Historic Places in New York (state)
Presbyterian churches in New York (state)
Gothic Revival church buildings in New York (state)
Churches in Monroe County, New York
National Register of Historic Places in Monroe County, New York